James William Hook (born 27 June 1985) is a retired Welsh rugby union player. Hook has won 81 caps for Wales (currently 13th all-time) and is Wales' fourth highest all-time points scorer. Most often playing as a fly-half, Hook is known as a utility player, and has also played as a centre, wing and fullback.

Hook began his club career with Neath, from 2004 to 2006. He then played for the Ospreys (2006–2011), Perpignan (2011–2014) and Gloucester (2014–2016), before returning to the Ospreys in 2016.

Hook toured South Africa in 2009 with the British & Irish Lions, making six appearances. He was named on the bench for the third test, but did not play in the game.

Early and personal life
Hook was born in the South Wales industrial town of Port Talbot, the second of three children. His brother Mike Hook was also a professional rugby player, and sister Naidine a keen netball player. He attended Glan Afan Comprehensive School in the centre of Port Talbot, and Neath College where he started a half back combination with Martin Roberts.

Hook's childhood heroes were Neil Jenkins and Robert Jones – Jenkins because of his kicking ability, and Jones because he played in Hook's favourite position, which was scrum-half, the position he himself played for West Wales at the age of ten.

In June 2011, Hook married long-term partner Kimberley. In 2004 Kimberley was in the U17 Welsh Netball Squad. The couple have a son, born on 23 December 2009. In 2014, Hook announced that Kimberley was pregnant with their second child.

Career

Club
Hook grew up playing schoolboy rugby with the junior and youth set-ups at various Port Talbot-based clubs including Aberavon Quins RFC, Taibach RFC and Corus (Port Talbot) RFC.

At senior level and before making the step up to regional rugby with the Ospreys, Hook enjoyed great success for Neath RFC, becoming the record holder for the highest individual points tally within a season. He also played for Neath College as a youngster.

Hook played his way into the Ospreys first XV in the 2006–07 Magners League season, giving outstanding performances at both fly-half and inside centre. He kicked a conversion in a Pool 3 match against the Sale Sharks during the 2006-07 Heineken Cup, clinching the Ospreys win following a try from Shane Williams.

In November 2010 it was announced that Hook would not be signing a new contract with the Ospreys. On 26 January 2011 James announced that he would be joining French Top 14 side USA Perpignan on a 3-year deal for the 2011–12 season despite warnings from Wales' national coach Warren Gatland that he may not consider players based outside Wales in his future squads.

On 2 June 2014, Hook was granted early release from USA Perpignan, following their relegation from the Top 14, to join Gloucester Rugby in the English Aviva Premiership on a three-year contract.

On 30 November 2016, Hook rejoined home region Ospreys in Wales on a three-year deal ahead of the 2017–18 season.

International
After excelling at under-21 level for Wales, Hook starred for the Welsh sevens team, scoring a match-winning try to defeat South Africa Sevens in the plate final of the 2006 Commonwealth Games. Hook made his international debut against Argentina under new Welsh coach Gareth Jenkins, scoring a late try in the match.

Hook made his home debut for Wales against Australia on 4 November 2006 as a substitute for the injured Stephen Jones. He showed great composure in scoring 13 points as Wales drew the match 29–29 and was named as Wales' Man of the Match. Hook played against the Pacific Islands, scoring a try, and against Canada where he scored 16 points.

During the 2007 Six Nations Championship, Hook played in all of Wales's games, but was hampered by being employed at inside centre, rather than in his preferred position of fly-half for the first four matches. As a result, he struggled to make an impact. In the final game against England, however, he was finally switched to fly-half and produced a Man of the Match-winning performance, scoring 22 points in Wales' 27–18 win. He also completed his first "full house" in this match (scoring a drop goal, penalty, try and conversion). The victory was Wales' first over a 'Tier One' rugby nation since the 2006 Six Nations Championship victory over Scotland.

Hook put in a man-of-the-match performance as he helped Wales beat England 26–19 in the first game of the 2008 Six Nations Championship on 2 February 2008.

On 10 February 2008, Hook was selected at fly-half for the 30–15 win over Scotland in the 2008 Six Nations Championship. Hook scored a try and kicked two conversions and a penalty, before being replaced by Stephen Jones in the 58th minute. He was a member of the Wales side that completed the Grand Slam with victory against France.

In May 2009, Hook was included in the 2009 British & Irish Lions tour to South Africa. He was called into the squad as a utility back to cover his Wales teammate, Leigh Halfpenny, who was forced to withdraw from the beginning of the tour with a thigh injury. He made his British & Irish Lions debut on 3 June, playing against the Lions Super Rugby team. Hook came off the bench in that game to score one try and kick 3 conversions. He did not however play in a test match on the tour.

In 2010, Hook was selected to the Wales 2010 Six Nations Championship team, playing for the first time at outside centre.

In January 2011 Hook confirmed he would join French side Perpignan on a three-year contract from the start of the 2011–12 season. His contract guaranteed availability for all of Wales's 2011 Rugby World Cup preparatory games. However, there is no clause covering future release outside of the normal International Rugby Board window.

International tries

Post rugby career
On 13 January 2020, Hook announced his retirement from the game, to take place at the end of the 2019–20 season upon expiration of his contract with the Ospreys. He mentioned wanting to remain involved in rugby by coaching, with focus on skills, but also with his first children-stories book in the release process.

On 11 August 2020, Hook stays with his team Ospreys as their new Kicking and Skills coach.

In 2021, Hook took part in S4C's Welsh language learning programme , being paired with referee Nigel Owens as his mentor.

References

External links
Gloucester Rugby profile
Ospreys profile
Profile at the Official website of the Welsh Rugby Union
Nigel Melville's scouting report in The Guardian, featuring James Hook
Wales Profile

1985 births
Living people
British & Irish Lions rugby union players from Wales
Rugby sevens players at the 2006 Commonwealth Games
Ospreys (rugby union) players
People educated at Glan Afan Comprehensive School
Rugby union players from Port Talbot
Rugby union fly-halves
Wales international rugby union players
Welsh rugby union players
Commonwealth Games rugby sevens players of Wales
Gloucester Rugby players
USA Perpignan players